Epialtinae is a subfamily of crabs, containing the following genera:

 Acanthonyx Latreille, 1828
 Alfredalcockia Števčić, 2005
 Antilibinia MacLeay, 1838 
 Cyclonyx Miers, 1879
 Epialtoides Garth, 1958
 Epialtus H. Milne-Edwards, 1834
 Esopus A. Milne-Edwards, 1875
 Eupleurodon Stimpson, 1871
 Goniothorax A. Milne-Edwards, 1878
 Griffinia Richer de Forges, 1994
 Huenia De Haan, 1837
 Leucippa H. Milne-Edwards, 1833
 Lophorochinia Garth, 1969
 Menaethiops Alcock, 1895
 Menaethius A. Milne-Edwards, 1834
 Mimulus Stimpson, 1860
 Mocosa  Stimpson, 1871
 Perinia Dana, 1851
 Pugettia Dana, 1851
 Sargassocarcinus Ward, 1936
 Simocarcinus Miers, 1879
 Taliepus A. Milne-Edwards, 1878
 Xenocarcinus White, 1847

Incertae sedis
 Acanthonyx elongatus White, 1847 (nomen nudum)
 Huenia dehaanii White, 1848
 Huenia proteus var. tenuipes Adams & White, 1848
 Inachus australis Gray, 1831
 Menaethius brevirostris Heller, 1862

References

Crustacean taxonomy
Arthropod subfamilies
Majoidea